The 1948 Brown Bears football team represented Brown University during the 1948 college football season.

In their fifth season under head coach Charles "Rip" Engle, the Bears compiled a 7–2 record, and outscored their opponents 242 to 103. N.J. Lacuele was the team captain.  

Brown played its home games at Brown Stadium in Providence, Rhode Island.

Schedule

References

Brown
Brown Bears football seasons
Brown Bears football